Harthill Royal Football Club are a Scottish football club based in the Greenrigg area of Harthill, West Lothian. Previously an amateur side called Harthill Royal Bar, the club shortened their name on joining the Scottish Junior Football Association, East Region in 1992. Club colours are royal blue. Their Gibbshill Park ground was previously the home of Polkemmet Juniors F.C. (1937–54, 1974–88) and known as Beechbank Park.

The SJFA restructured prior to the 2006–07 season, and Royal found themselves in the 15-team East Region, South Division. Harthill spent all of their time in the bottom tier of the Juniors, with a best finish of 3rd in 2007–08. 

For the 2021–22 season, they joined West of Scotland Football League in the senior pyramid and were placed in Division Four. Despite their ground's West Lothian location being in the East of Scotland Football League catchment area, the club was allowed to choose which league to join due to the village of Harthill being situated in North Lanarkshire. However, the club then returned to the East of Scotland Football League, joining the Third Division for the 2022–23 season.

Club staff

Board of directors

Coaching staff

Source

Managerial history

c Caretaker manager

Honours
Dechmont League Cup: 1999–00, 2004–05
Lothians District Division Two winners: 2002–03
East Region Division Two winners: 1992–93, 1994–95, 1999–00
Brown Cup: 2002–03

References

Sources
Non-league Scotland
Scottish Football Historical Archive

Football clubs in Scotland
Scottish Junior Football Association clubs
Association football clubs established in 1992
Football in West Lothian
1992 establishments in Scotland
West of Scotland Football League teams
East of Scotland Football League teams